Syed, also known as Sayyid or Sayed is a family of Syeds in South Asia, notably India and Pakistan.

Syeds are said to be the direct descendants of the Islamic Prophet Muhammad, and the title is usually used in front of the given name as a title, meaning lord, master or sir and is used as a surname in honour of their ancestor. 

The Arabic meaning of Syed is noble one. Syed's are the most honourable, respected, educated and high ranking individuals among muslims. In these countries, the title "Syed", an honorific that denotes descent from Muhammad, is the most common English spelling of the Arabic term Sayyid (سيد).